Beekman Winthrop (September 18, 1874 – November 10, 1940) was an American lawyer, government official and banker. He served as the governor of Puerto Rico from 1904 to 1907, as assistant secretary of the Treasury in 1907–1909, and assistant secretary of the Navy in 1909–1913.

Early life
The son of Robert Winthrop and Kate Wilson Taylor, Beekman "Beek" Winthrop came from a family of wealth and influence in New York. He was born in Orange, New Jersey and attended Harvard University in Cambridge, Massachusetts where he received a Bachelor of Arts (A.B.) degree in 1897 and a LL.B degree from Harvard Law School in 1900, graduating second in his class.

Career

A descendant of both John Winthrop, first Governor of Massachusetts, and John Winthrop, the Younger, first Governor of Connecticut, immediately after graduating he became a personal secretary to future president William Howard Taft while Taft was Governor-General of the Philippines. Winthrop was soon promoted to Assistant Executive Secretary of the Philippines (1901–1903) and was appointed as a Judge of the Court of First Instance, Philippine Islands (1903–1904). He was known to be a personal friend of Theodore Roosevelt and was appointed by him in 1904 as Governor and General Commander of Puerto Rico, at age 28. He was confirmed by the Congress. Melza Riggs Wood (1870–1928), four years his senior, whom he married in 1903, became the First Lady of Puerto Rico.

Winthrop took oath as governor of Puerto Rico on July 4, 1904, and served until April 17, 1907. On his inauguration, he promised improvements to the educational system of Puerto Rico. Winthrop was a proponent of bringing citizenship and locally elected officials to Puerto Rico system of governance. The press reported favorably on Winthrop's activities, and reporters were especially impressed with Mrs. Winthrop's fluency in Spanish, which made her popular among local population.

In 1907, Winthrop was appointed as Assistant Secretary of the Treasury. In 1909, he was made Assistant Secretary of the Navy, a post he retained, functioning in time of need as Acting Secretary, until 1913, when he was succeeded by a young New Yorker, Franklin D. Roosevelt.

Later life

Following his retirement from public service in 1913, he was a director of National City Bank. He resigned from the bank in 1916. He subsequently became a senior partner of Robert Winthrop & Co. in New York, from which capacity he stepped down in 1939. At the end of his life he lived in New York on East 69th Street, where he died on November 10, 1940. He is buried at Green-Wood Cemetery.

The Winthrops did not have children, however, Nathaniel Thayer Winthrop, a son of Frederic Bayard Winthrop, named his son, Beekman Winthrop (1941–2014) to honor his uncle.

References

Further reading
 Letters of Beekman Winthrop to William Howard Taft and Theodore Roosevelt, The Theodore Roosevelt Center at Dickinson State University
 Clark, Truman R. Puerto Rico and the United States, 1917–1933. Pittsburgh, Pa.: University of Pittsburgh Press, 1975.

External links

 
 Photograph album of Beekman Winthrop, ca. 1897-1898, ArchiveGrid

1874 births
1940 deaths
Governors of Puerto Rico
People from Orange, New Jersey
New York (state) Republicans
Republican Party (Puerto Rico) politicians
United States Assistant Secretaries of the Navy
Harvard Law School alumni
Winthrop family
Burials at Green-Wood Cemetery
American people of English descent
American corporate directors
People from the Upper East Side
Harvard College alumni